Dejan Antić (born 9 December 1968) is a Serbian chess player who holds the title of Grandmaster.

Biography
In March 1988 he won the Belgrade Open. In 1989, Antic became a FIDE Master (FM). In 1991 he became an International Master (IM) and in 1999 Antic became a Grandmaster (GM).

He tied for first at the Sydney International Open in April 2007.

In 2009, Antic won the Bulgarian Open Championship in Plovdiv.

In 2015, Antic won the Serbian Chess Championship on tiebreaks and represented Serbia at the European Team Chess Championship, scoring 1/2 on reserve board.

In 2005, FIDE awarded him the FIDE Trainer title and in 2015 he became FIDE Senior Trainer.

He is the co-author of two well-known books "The Modern French" in 2012 and "The Modern Bogo" in 2014. He has contributed articles on opening theory for "Yearbook" since 2007, and Chessbase Magazine from 2013 to 2014..

References

External links
 
 
 

1968 births
Living people
Serbian chess players
Sportspeople from Belgrade
Chess grandmasters
Serbian chess writers
Sportspeople from Jagodina